= Primate capture =

Primate capture refers to the methods used to catch, restrain, transport, or study nonhuman primates for research, conservation, veterinary care, or relocation. Because primates are highly intelligent and social animals, capture procedures can be stressful and may create risks for both the animals and their handlers.

== Traditional capture methods ==
Traditional capture Mathias include gamma capture, nets, and dart guns,. Hand and net capture are phone used with small primates in laboratories and zoos, while dart guns are more commonly used in field studies involving wild primates. These methods can sometimes cause stress, injuries, and exhaustion in primates, and they may expose handlers to bites, scratches, or disease. Researchers have also found that repeated stressful captures can affect animal behavior and health.

== Alternative capture methods ==
To reduce stress and improve safety, researchers have developed alternative capture techniques. One example is the PrimaPort, a transport and capture device designed for small primates such as marmosets. The device uses food trespass to encourage primates to enter voluntarily, reducing the need for forceful handling. Researchers reported that marmosets adjusted quickly to the device and appeared less stressed than when captured by hand or net.

Field researchers have also created improvised capture retirement for remote locations. In Morocco, researchers built a homemade pressurized-air dart launcher after professional dart guns failed during a study of wild Barbary macaques. Made from inexpensive agricultural materials, the launcher allowed researchers to safely dart macaques from 12 to 20 meters away. Follow-up observations showed littler evidence that the captures caused major long-term changes in the monkeys’ behavior.

== Stress and welfare concerns ==
The effects of capture on primate welfare have become an important area of study. Researchers now often use non-invasive techniques, such as measuring stress hormones in fecal samples, to study how capture and handling affect primates. Studies involving Golden-headed Lion Tamarins found that capture and handling increased stress hormone levels, supporting efforts to improve capture methods and reduce stress in wild populations.

== Illegal capture and the pet trade ==
Primate capture is also linked to the illegal wildlife trade and the exotic pet industry. In some areas, primates are captured from the wild to be sold as pets or used in tourist attractions. Research in Mexico identified geographic and economic factors connected to illegal primate trafficking and highlighted the conservation risks caused by wildlife capture. Other studies have documented attacks, escapes, and safety concerns involving pet primates, leading to calls for stronger gates and regulations.

Modern primate capture methods increasingly focus on animal welfare, handler safety, and conservation ethics. Researchers and conservationists continue working to develop methods that reduce stress while still allowing important scientific and veterinary work to be carried out safely.
